Journey Into Stone is a 1972 thriller novel by the British writer Audrey Erskine Lindop. Peace in the sleepy little village of Parkley is shattered by a burglary, followed by a series of crimes of increasing intensity.

References

Bibliography
 Vinson, James. Twentieth-Century Romance and Gothic Writers. Macmillan, 1982.

1972 British novels
Novels by Audrey Erskine Lindop
British thriller novels